The 1978 FIM Motocross World Championship was the 22nd F.I.M. Motocross Racing World Championship season.

Summary
Heikki Mikkola successfully defended his 500cc world championship for Yamaha, finishing ahead of Honda's Brad Lackey. Mikkola dominated the season with 14 moto victories in 24 outings. Roger De Coster had a serious accident during pre-season training and ended up having his spleen removed but, recovered to finish the season in third place.

Guennady Moisseev was also successful in defending his 250cc title despite a strong challenge from Kawasaki's Torleif Hansen. In the 125cc championship, Akira Watanabe ended the three-year reign of his Suzuki teammate, Gaston Rahier. Watanabe's championship marks the first and only motocross world championship for a Japanese competitor. Gerard Rond won four Grand Prix overall victories for Yamaha and finished in third place, one point behind Rahier.

Grands Prix

500cc

250cc

125cc

Final standings

References

External links
 

FIM Motocross World Championship season
Motocross World Championship seasons